Alamshah Halima Begum (1460–1522) was an Aq Qoyunlu princess. She was the daughter of Uzun Hasan and Teodora Despina Khatun, and the mother of Ismail I.

Name 
There are different opinions about her real name. It may have been Halima, Halime, Alamshah, Alemshah, Alamşah, Alemşah, or Martha (for Christian author).

Life 
Her father was the Aq Qoyunlu ruler Uzun Hasan and her mother was the daughter of John IV of Trebizond, Theodora Megale Komnene, also known as "Despina Hatun". There is no reliable information about the first years of her life. In 1471 she married Sheikh Haydar, the son of her aunt Khadija Khatun (her father's sister) and the sheikh of the Safavid Order. They had three sons, Ali Mirza Safavi, Ibrahim and Ismail I and four daughters.

Issue
By her husband, she had three sons and four daughters:
 Ismail I (1487 - 1524). First Shah of Safavid dynasty. 
 Ali Mirza Safavi (d. 1494). He was the penultimate head of the Safavid order.
 Shaykh Ibrahim.
 Fakhr Jahan Khanum. She married Bayram Beg Qaramanlu. 
 Melek Khanum. She married Abdallah Khan Shamlu. 
 A daughter who married Husayn Beg Shamlu.
 A daughter who married Shah Ali Beg.

References 

1522 deaths
1460 births
People from the Aq Qoyunlu
People of Byzantine descent
Safavid dynasty
16th-century Iranian women